Richard Devine may refer to:

Richard A. Devine, former State's Attorney for Cook County, Illinois 
Richard Devine, Atlanta-based electronic musician

See also
Richard David Vine, U.S. diplomat